Devdas Chhotray is an Indian Odia author, administrator  and academician. He was the first vice-chancellor of Ravenshaw University, Cuttack, Odisha. His work consists of poetry, short stories, lyrics, musicals and screenplays. Chhotray's father Gopal Chhotray, a recipient of Padma, Central Sahitya Akademi and Sangeet Natak Akademi Award, was an architect of modern Odia theatre.

Early life, Education & Career 

Chhotray was educated at Ravenshaw College (now Ravenshaw University) and Cornell University. After joining the Indian Administrative Service in 1971, he worked in West Bengal, Bihar, Orissa and New Delhi. In 2006 Chhotray became the first vice-chancellor of Ravenshaw University, obtained UGC approval for the school in six months.

Chhotray was director of the Orissa Film Development Corporation from 1983–89 and 1996–98,  chairman of the publications committee for the fifth International Children’s Film Festival in 1987 and was vice-president of the governing council of the Film and Television Institute of India in Pune from 1999–2001.

Lyrics credit 

 Boura Hatabaksa
 Pahili Raja
 Nandini I Love U
 Laxmi Pratima
 Puja Pain Phulatie
 Tu Eka Aama Saha Bharasa
 To Akhi Mo Aina
 Paradesi Babu
 Kapala Likhana
 Suna Chadhei
 Chaka Aakhi Sabu Dekhuchi
 Chaka Bhaunri
 Sapana Banika
 Sahari Bagha
 Jaga Hatare Pagha
 Hira Nila

Books, Writings

He has written a collection of stories, Lal Machha (Red Fish), the lyrics for more than 75 films in Oriya and television musicals. Chhotray is known for his collaboration with Akshaya Mohanty, a pioneer in modern Oriya music from the 1960s until his death in 2002, as Mohanty's principal songwriter.

He has written screenplays for feature films in Oriya. One, Indradhanura Chhai (Shadows of the Rainbow) was screened at the Cannes Film Festival in 1995.

In addition to Chhotray's anthologies of poems and stories in Oriya, notably Nila Saraswati (Blue Muse) and Hati Saja Kara (Order the Elephants), English translations of his poems have appeared in Longing (published by Pimlico Books in London). An anthology of his poems in Hindi, Ret Ki Sidhi (A Staircase of Sand) has been published in Delhi.

Awards 

Chhotray's four decades of poetry and lyrics have been translated into Indian and foreign languages, and he has been published in Bengali (in the Sunil Gangopadhyaya-edited Krittibas. He has received the Prajatantra Bisuv Milan and Utkal Samaj Centenary (Gangadhar Meher Samman) Awards and the 2008 Rajdhani Book Fair Award 2008 for poetry.

  Odisha Excellence Award 2018

References

External links

1955 births
Living people
Writers from Odisha